The  Stewiacke Valley is a Canadian rural region in central Nova Scotia running from western Pictou County through southern Colchester County to the Shubenacadie River .

The Stewiacke River flows through the length of the valley.  The economy is primarily farming and lumbering. Nova Scotia Route 289 is the primary road running through the valley.

Communities

Stewiacke
Upper Stewiacke 
Middle Stewiacke
Brookfield
Upper Brookfield
Pleasant Valley
Green Creek
Green Oaks
Sheepherders Junction
Forest Glen
Brentwood
Cloverdale

References
Upper Stewiacke
Stewiacke Valley
Stewiacke Valley Museum

Valleys of Nova Scotia
Landforms of Colchester County